Rhodocollybia is a genus of Basidiomycete mushroom. Species in this genus, formerly classified as a subgenus in Collybia, have fairly large caps (typically larger than  broad), and have a pinkish-tinted spore print. Microscopically, they are characterized by having spores and basidia that are dextrinoid—staining deep reddish to reddish-brown with Melzer's reagent when tested for amyloidity. Rhodocollybia species are commonly found in temperate North America and Europe, and infrequently in Central and South America.

Taxonomy
The genus name Rhodocollybia was first used by Rolf Singer in 1939 to describe those species of Collybia with a pink spore deposit; in later works he considered the genera equivalent (synonymous) and called them Collybia. In 1997, Antonín and Noordeloos studied various members of Collybia using phylogenetic analysis, and reorganized  the genus, dividing species into either Collybia, Gymnopus, or Rhodocollybia.

Description
The surface of the cap is often uneven, and slimy or slippery (lubricous) to the touch. The cap color can range from whitish to dark reddish brown. The gills are whitish to pinkish cream in color, and have an adnexed attachment to the stem. This type of agaric, collybioid mushroom has pale spore deposits which range from pinkish buff to pinkish cream.

Microscopic features

Spores in this species are typically spherical to ellipsoid in shape, and translucent (hyaline). Rhodocollybia is characterized by having an endosporium (inner wall of the spore) that is dextrinoid (staining yellowish or reddish-brown in iodine-containing solutions such as Melzer's reagent), and sometimes cyanophilous. The spore wall may be thin to thick (up to 0.5 µm).

Habitat and distribution
Rhodocollybia species are found growing scattered to clustered together on forest duff or on well-rotted wood, in coniferous forests. Species of Rhodocollybia can be found in various parts of the United States, including Maine, Hawaii, and in California in conifer woods on needle duff or on rotting wood. Species in this genus can also be found in such European countries as Poland and the Czech Republic. A 1989 work by mycologist Roy Halling reported three neotropical species: R. turpis from Colombia and Costa Rica, C. popayanica from Colombia, and C. sleumeri from Ecuador.

Species

Rhodocollybia amica
Rhodocollybia antioquiana
Rhodocollybia badiialba
Rhodocollybia butyracea (Buttery Collybia)
Rhodocollybia distorta
Rhodocollybia 
Rhodocollybia 
Rhodocollybia filamentosa
Rhodocollybia fodiens
Rhodocollybia fusipes (= Gymnopus fusipes)
Rhodocollybia giselae
Found in the Mediterranean region of Europe (Italy and France), grows in thermophilous forests with Holm Oak (Quercus ilex), Strawberry trees (Arbutus unedo) and Pine trees (genus Pinus).
Rhodocollybia incarnata
Rhodocollybia laulaha
Rhodocollybia lentinoides
Rhodocollybia lignitilis
Rhodocollybia longispora
Rhodocollybia maculata (Spotted Toughshank)
Rhodocollybia meridana
Rhodocollybia monticola
Rhodocollybia oregonensis
Rhodocollybia 
Rhodocollybia popayanica
Rhodocollybia prolixa
Rhodocollybia sleumeri
Rhodocollybia spissa
Rhodocollybia stenosperma
Rhodocollybia subnigra
Rhodocollybia subsulcatipes
Rhodocollybia tablensis
Rhodocollybia turpis
Cap  in diameter, light yellow in youth but turning pale orange with brown streaks and spots in maturity. Found in Colombia.
Rhodocollybia unakensis

See also

List of Marasmiaceae genera

References

Further reading
 Bas, C., Kyper, T.W., Noordeloos, M.E. & Vellinga, E.C. (1995). Flora Agaricina Neerlandica—Critical monographs on the families of agarics and boleti occurring in the Netherlands. Volume 3. Tricholomataceae. A. A. Balkema: Rotterdam, Netherlands. 183 p.
 Halling, R.E. (1983). The Genus Collybia (Agaricales) in the Northeastern United States and Adjacent Canada. J. Cramer: Braunschweig, Germany. 148 p.
 Desjardin, D. E., R. E. Halling & D. E. Hemmes (1999). Agaricales of the Hawaiian Islands. 5. The genera Rhodocollybia and Gymnopus. Mycologia 91

Agaricales genera
Marasmiaceae